Fenaia Il Maten, or Ifenain Ilmathen is a town in northern Algeria. The Béni Mansour-Bejaïa line traverses this community.

-

Communes of Béjaïa Province
Béjaïa Province